Rey Ángel "Boom-Boom" Martínez (born May 13, 1980) is a Cuban footballer who most recently played for the Syracuse Silver Knights.

Career

Professional
Martínez began his career with Ciudad la Habana in his native Cuba, before defecting to the United States during the 2002 Gold Cup along with his national teammate Alberto Delgado.  Martínez joined the Colorado Rapids of Major League Soccer on June 11, 2004, and finished his first year with the Rapids with one assist in seven appearances (three starts), but struggled with injuries for much of the season. He was released by the Rapids before the 2005 season and signed with Rochester Rhinos of the USL First Division.
Martínez was used regularly as a late second-half attacking substitute, and went on to make 60 appearances for the Rhinos until August 2008, when he signed for the Carolina RailHawks for the rest of the season.  In the fall of 2005, he moved indoors with the St. Louis Steamers.  When the Steamers withdrew from the league during the summer of 2006, the Baltimore Blast selected Martinez in the third round of the dispersal draft.  He played two seasons in Baltimore.  On November 6, 2008, Martinez signed with the New Jersey Ironmen in the Xtreme Soccer League., and played for them for two seasons before returning to outdoor soccer with the Real Maryland Monarchs in the USL Second Division for the 2009 season.

In 2011, Martinez signed with the Rochester Lancers of the MISL.

International
He made his international debut for Cuba in a June 2000 FIFA World Cup qualification against Canada and has earned a total of 17 caps, scoring no goals. He represented his country in the Gold Cup, Copa Caribe, and Pan American Games.

His final international was a January 2002 CONCACAF Gold Cup match against South Korea.

References

External links

External links
 
 

1980 births
Living people
Sportspeople from Havana
Defecting Cuban footballers
Association football midfielders
Cuban footballers
Cuba international footballers
2002 CONCACAF Gold Cup players
FC Ciudad de La Habana players
Colorado Rapids players
Rochester New York FC players
St. Louis Steamers (2003–2006 MISL) players
Baltimore Blast (2001–2008 MISL) players
North Carolina FC players
New Jersey Ironmen players
Real Maryland F.C. players
Philadelphia KiXX (2001–2008 MISL) players
Cuban expatriate footballers
Expatriate soccer players in the United States
Cuban expatriate sportspeople in the United States
Major League Soccer players
USL First Division players
Major Indoor Soccer League (2001–2008) players
Xtreme Soccer League players
Major Arena Soccer League players